Sir Vivian Arthur Ramsey FREng (born 24 May 1950), is a former judge of the High Court of England and Wales and former civil engineer.

Education and early career
He was educated at Abingdon School.

Legal career 
As a specialist in construction law, Sir Vivian was assigned to the Technology and Construction Court and was subsequently made Judge in charge of the Court in 2007. He was appointed a Fellow of the Royal Academy of Engineering in 2013.

Other work
He was on the governing body of Abingdon School from 2009 to 2016.

See also
 AMP v. Persons Unknown
 List of Old Abingdonians

References

External links
 CCLR
 Keating Chambers

1950 births
Living people
British civil engineers
English barristers
Queen's Bench Division judges
People educated at Abingdon School
Knights Bachelor
Governors of Abingdon School